Berner Monroe Bonifant (May 29, 1870 – May 30, 1931) was an American farmer and politician who served in the Virginia House of Delegates.

References

External links 

1870 births
1931 deaths
Members of the Virginia House of Delegates
20th-century American politicians